This is a list of awards and nominations received by iKon, a South Korean boy band formed in 2015 by YG Entertainment. After their debut in 2015, the group won the best new artist award at the Mnet Asian Music Awards, Melon Music Awards, Seoul Music Awards, Golden Disc Awards, and Gaon Chart K-Pop Awards. In 2016 the group focused their activities in Japan and China, which led them to win the best new artist award at the Japan Record Awards and QQ Music Awards.

Korean

Asia Artist Awards

Gaon Chart Music Awards

Genie Music Awards

Golden Disc Awards

Mnet Asian Music Awards

Seoul Music Awards

Melon Music Awards

Melon Popularity Award

Soribada Best K-Music Awards

Arena Homme+'s A-awards

V Live Awards

The Fact Music Awards

International

Asian Pop Music Awards

China Music Awards

Japan Record Award

Japan Gold Disc Award

Netease Attitude Awards

QQ Music Awards

Notes

References

iKon
Awards